Lee Ki-ho (the author's preferred Romanization per LTI Korea) is a South Korean writer.

Life
Lee Ki-ho was born in Wonju, Gangwon Province, South Korea, in 1972. Lee Ki-ho debuted when his short story “Birney” won the monthly Modern Literature New Writer's Contest in 1999. He is currently a professor in the department of creative writing at Gwangju University.

Work
Lee Ki-ho is considered to be one of South Korea's most unusual writers to the extent that one critic has declared that the conventions of a story cannot be applied to Lee's work. Lee debuted in 1999 with “Bunny,” a short story that seems to reflect the rhythms of rap, as well as pansori, a traditional Korean ballad. The stories following his debut are just as diversely experimental, for one story borrows the question and answer method of an interrogation, while another adopts the writing style and typeset of the Bible, and still another uses language that is suggestive of the kind used on a TV cooking show.

Lee is inventive not only with form, but also with his characters, who are a humble and sordid lot: a small-time pimp who dropped out of high school after assaulting a teacher; a third-rate actor addicted to glue; a gang member who had grown up in an orphanage; and a character who ekes out a living by working at a local convenience store. Lee's stories not only feature these back alley types, but also those with abnormal traits, such as a youth who has eyes in the back of his head and a man who falls in love with a flagstaff from where the national flag hangs.

These misfits, who seem to have jumped straight out of tabloids or entertainment programs, are distinctive and, at the same time, very real individuals who can be easily found on the fringes of society. A character named Lee Sibong, who appears regularly in Lee's work, is portrayed a little differently in each story but is, for the most part, a pathetic and naïve flunky with no luck whatsoever, someone who seems to be the epitome of human failure. By ridiculing the lives of these vulgar yet common characters, Lee makes his readers laugh. However, the target of our laughter quickly becomes our own society that is steeped in arrogance and artifice, for the characters’ vulgarity, naiveté, and tragic failures symbolize the failings of our society.

Lee has had one novel translated into English, At Least We Can Apologize in 2013. At Least We Can Apologize has been described as:

post-modern, and a bit absurd, but also a fun read on at least two levels. First is the surface level, as a farcical course of events. Second is as a metaphor for the ability of power, particularly when it can instill guilt in the powerless, to control without having to use formal control, and how that, once unbalanced, can spill completely out of control.

In 2010 Lee won the Yi Hyo-seok Literature Prize.

Works in English translation
 At Least We Can Apologize (사과는 잘해요; translator: Christopher J. Dykas), 2013, Dalkey Archive Press, 
 So Far, and Yet So Near (밀수록 다시 가까워지는; translator: Theresa Kim), 2014, ASIA Publishers, 
 Kwon Sun-chan and Nice People (권순찬과 착한 사람들; translator: Stella Kim), 2015, ASIA Publishers,

Works in Korean (partial)
Novels
 At Least We Can Apologize
Short story collections
 Choi Sunduk: Filled with the Holy Spirit (2004)
 I Knew If I Stayed around Long Enough, Something like This Would Happen (2006)

Awards
 Modern Literature New Writer's Contest (1999)
 Yi Hyo-seok Literature Prize (2010)

References

External links

1972 births
Korean writers
Living people
Chugye University for the Arts alumni